is a Japanese actor and singer who is represented by the talent agency, G.P.R.

Biography
In 2002, Shirakawa debuted in Ninpuu Sentai Hurricaneger as Ikkou Kasumi / Kabuto Raiger. He contested with Shun Shioya which became the "Handsome Hero Boom". Shirakawa played a big brother in the series, but he actually has an older sister.

He was also active in stage as an actor. He is also the main vocal of the chorus group Junretsu.

Shirakawa, with Kohei Yamamoto, Nobuo Kyo, Ryuichiro Nishioka, and Yūsuke Tomoi, became a member of the clothes brand Anunnaki.

Filmography

TV series

Films

References

External links
 Official profile 

1976 births
Living people
Male actors from Yokohama